Ice Dragon or Ice Dragons may refer to:

 Ice Dragon (Kirby), a dinosaur-like monster that appears in Kirby's Dream Land 2
 The Ice Dragon, a children's fantasy novella by George R. R. Martin
 "The Ice Dragon" (Game of Thrones), a sixth episode in Game of Thrones (2014 video game)
 Ice Dragons (Ledeni Zmajevi), the nickname of the Bosnia and Herzegovina men's national ice hockey team